Helen Perlstein Pollard (born 1946) is an American academic ethnohistorian and archaeologist, known for her publications and research on pre-Columbian cultures in the west-central Mexico region.

Biography
As an undergraduate Pollard studied at Barnard College, a women's liberal arts college in New York City affiliated with Columbia University, graduating in 1967. One of her contemporaries at Barnard, who graduated two years earlier, was Esther Pasztory, another Mesoamerican scholar who became renowned as an art historian and specialist in Teotihuacano art. Pollard obtained her PhD in anthropology in 1972, awarded by Columbia University, with a dissertation entitled "Prehispanic Urbanism at Tzintzuntzan, Michoacan".

Pollard's particular area of expertise is the study of the Tarascan state, a tributary state that flourished in the Postclassic period of Mesoamerican chronology in a region largely coinciding with the modern-day Mexican state of Michoacán. Drawing from her extensive archaeological fieldwork conducted in the Lake Pátzcuaro Basin, Pollard's research has investigated themes such as the formation of proto-states, the centralization of political control, development and emergence of social stratification and inequalities, and the human ecology of adaptations within pre-modern cultures in response to environmental changes and instabilities.

 Pollard is an Emerita professor of the Department of Anthropology at Michigan State University (MSU). She currently resides in El Cerrito, California.

Publications

Notes

References

1946 births
Living people
American archaeologists
American Mesoamericanists
Women Mesoamericanists
Mesoamerican archaeologists
20th-century Mesoamericanists
21st-century Mesoamericanists
Columbia University alumni
Barnard College alumni
Michigan State University faculty
American women archaeologists
20th-century American women writers
21st-century American women writers
American women academics